Lőkösháza is a village in Békés County, in the Southern Great Plain region of southeast Hungary.

Geography

An important railway line crosses the Hungarian-Romanian border here (the Budapest–Szolnok–Békéscsaba–Lőkösháza–Arad–Bucharest–Sofia–Istanbul line).

References

Populated places in Békés County
1418 establishments in Europe
Hungary–Romania border crossings